Naruepol Fairtex (born July 1, 1984) is a Thai welterweight kickboxer fighting out of Evolve MMA in Singapore. He is a former Lumpinee Stadium champion and current No.1 contender to challenge Nopadetch Chuwattana for the WBC title.

In 2007 Naruepol was featured on the reality show The Contender Asia, where he was stopped in Episode 9 by Yodsaenklai Fairtex.

Biography and career
Naruepol was born near Bangkok in Central Thailand. He started practicing Muaythai when he was 7 years old at the Sakomsing Gym and had his first fight a year later. Naruepol joined Fairtex Gym in 2005.

In 1999, Naruepol won the Lumpinee belt from Chokdee Por.Pramuk.

He was scheduled to face Andy Souwer at Fighterzone Kickboxing World Series MAX in Singapore on February 25, 2012. However, they were not paid by the promoter and the fight did not happen.

On May 27, 2018 in Oakland, California, Naruepol Fairtex defeated Phuket-based Gold Coast, Australia native Eddie Farrell (20-7-2) by TKO (**cut) at 1:17 of round 5 to win the IKF Pro Full Muay Thai Rules world title.

Titles and accomplishments
 2018 IKF Pro Full Muay Thai Rules Middleweight World Champion
 2005 Champion of Thailand 140 lbs
 1999 Lumpinee champion

Fight record 

|-  style="background:#cfc;"
| 2019-04-19 || Win ||align=left| Scott Mackenzie || Triumphant Muay Thai 7 || Las Vegas, Nevada || Decision (Unanimous) || 5 || 3:00
|-  style="background:#cfc;"
| 2018-05-27 || Win ||align=left| Eddie Farrell || Triumphant Muay Thai 4 || Oakland, California || TKO (Cut) || 5 || 1:17
|-  style="background:#cfc;"
| 2017-03-03 || Win ||align=left| Amadeu Cristiano || Lion Fight 35 || Mashantucket, Connecticut || Decision (Unanimous) || 5 ||  3:00
|-
|-  bgcolor=
| 2013-07-05 ||  ||align=left| Sharos Huyer ||  || Trieste, Italy ||  ||  ||  
|-
|-  bgcolor="#CCFFCC"
| 2012-04-28 || Win ||align=left| Karim Ghajji || Boxe Thai et K1 Rules à Bagnolet || Paris, France || Decision || 5 || 3:00 
|-
|-  bgcolor="#CCFFCC"
| 2011-11-05 || Win ||align=left| Yin Jie || Legends of Heroes || ChangSha China || Decision || 3 || 3:00
|-
|-  bgcolor="#FFBBBB"
| 2011-08-13 || Loss ||align=left| Zhao YaFei || Legends of Heroes: Kung Fu vs Muaythai || Nanchang China || Decision || 3 || 3:00
|-
|-  bgcolor="#CCFFCC"
| 2011-06-18 || Win ||align=left| Jonay Risco || China Fight Night || China || Decision || 3 || 3:00
|-
|-  bgcolor="#CCFFCC"
| 2011-04-30 || Win ||align=left| Marco Piqué || Ring Rules Kickboxing || Milan, Italy || Ext.R Decision || 4 || 3:00
|-  bgcolor="#FFBBBB"
| 2010-12-18 || Loss ||align=left| Abdallah Mabel || La Nuit des Challenges 9 || Lyon, France || TKO (Elbow/Cut) || 3 || 
|-  bgcolor="#CCFFCC"
| 2010-10-09 || Win ||align=left| Toshiya Kurenai || Legends of Heroes: Muaythai vs Kung Fu, Arena of Stars, Genting Highlands || Pahang, Malaysia || Decision || 5 || 3:00
|-
|-  bgcolor="#FFBBBB"
| 2009-12-19|| Loss ||align=left| Liu Ceng Ceng || Chinese Kung Fu vs Muaythai Competition at Lingnan Pearl Stadium || Foshan, China || Decision || 5 || 3:00
|-  bgcolor="#FFBBBB"
| 2009-12-05|| Loss ||align=left| Cosmo Alexandre || Kings Birthday 2009 Muaythai Championship, Sanam Luang || Bangkok, Thailand || TKO (Referee stoppage) || ||
|-  bgcolor="#CCFFCC"
| 2009-12-05|| Win ||align=left| Cedric Muller || Kings Birthday 2009 Muaythai Championship, Sanam Luang || Bangkok, Thailand || Decision (Unanimous) || 3 || 3:00
|-  bgcolor="#CCFFCC"
| 2009-10-09 || Win ||align=left| Soren Monkongtong || Evolution 18 || Melbourne, Australia || KO (Right high Kick) || 1 || 2:59
|-  bgcolor="#CCFFCC"
| 2009-09-13|| Win ||align=left| Christophe Pruvost || M-1 Fairtex Muaythai event || Tokyo, Japan || Decision (Unanimous) || 5 || 3:00
|-  bgcolor="#FFBBBB"
| 2008-11-29|| Loss ||align=left| Yohan Lidon || Le Nuit des Champions || Marseilles, France || TKO (Dislocated shoulder) || 3 || 
|-  bgcolor="#FFBBBB"
| 2008-11-08 || Loss ||align=left| Giorgio Petrosyan || Janus Fight Night "The Legend" || Padova, Italy || Decision (Unanimous) || 5 || 3:00
|-  bgcolor="#CCFFCC"
| 2008-09-18 || Win ||align=left| Soren Monkongtong || Return of "The Contenders" || Singapore || Decision (Unanimous) || 5 || 3:00
|-  bgcolor="#CCFFCC"
| 2008-06-25 || Win ||align=left| Vuyisile Colossa || Planet Battle || Hong Kong || Decision || 3 || 3:00
|-
|-  bgcolor="#CCFFCC"
| 2008-03-03 || Win ||align=left| Fadi Merza || SLAMM "Nederland vs Thailand IV" || Almere, Netherlands || TKO (Corner stop/gave up) || 4 || 0:00
|-  bgcolor="#CCFFCC"
| 2007-11-29|| Win ||align=left| Wilfred Montagne || France vs  Thailand|| Paris, France || TKO (Referee stoppage) || 3 || 
|-  bgcolor="#FFBBBB"
| 2007-09-00 || Loss ||align=left| Yodsaenklai Fairtex || The Contender Asia Season I, Episode 9 || Singapore || KO (Punches) || 2 || 0:30
|-  bgcolor="#CCFFCC"
| 2007-09-00 || Win ||align=left| Trevor Smandych || The Contender Asia Season I, Episode 1 || Singapore || Decision (Unanimous) || 5 || 3:00
|-  bgcolor="#CCFFCC"
| 2007-05-28 || Win ||align=left| Nontachai Sit-O || Daowrungchujarern Fights, Rajadamnern Stadium || Bangkok, Thailand || Decision || 5 || 3:00
|-  bgcolor="#CCFFCC"
| 2007-04-20|| Win ||align=left| Yohan Lidon || Gala de Levallois-Perret || Levallois, France || Decision || 5 || 3:00
|-  bgcolor="#CCFFCC"
| 2006-10-16 || Win ||align=left| Big Ben Chor Praram 6 || Daowrungchujarern Fights, Rajadamnern Stadium || Bangkok, Thailand || Decision  || 5 || 3:00
|-  bgcolor="#cfc"
| 2006-05-14 || Win||align=left| Nontachai Sit-O || Channel 7 Stadium || Bangkok, Thailand || Decision || 5 || 3:00
|-  bgcolor="#CCFFCC"
| 2006-04-17 || Win ||align=left| Chaowalit Jockygym || Daorungchujarean Fights, Rajadamnern Stadium || Bangkok, Thailand || Decision || 5 || 3:00
|-
! style=background:white colspan=9 |

|-  bgcolor="#FFBBBB"
| 2005-10-07 || Loss ||align=left| Noppadeat Siangsimaewgym || Prianun Fights, Lumpinee Stadium || Bangkok, Thailand || Decision || 5 || 3:00
|-
|-  bgcolor="#CCFFCC"
| 2005-09-09 || Win ||align=left| Khunsuk Phetsupapan || Paianun Fights, Lumpinee Stadium || Bangkok, Thailand || Decision (Unanimous) || 5 || 3:00
|-
! style=background:white colspan=9 |
|-
|-  bgcolor="#CCFFCC"
| 2005-08-05 || Win ||align=left| Phetnumaik S.Siriwat || Paianun Fights, Rajadamnern Stadium || Bangkok, Thailand || Decision || 5 || 3:00
|-
|-  bgcolor="#FFBBBB"
| 2005-01-11 || Loss ||align=left| Munkong Kiatsomkuan || Prianun Fights, Lumpinee Stadium || Bangkok, Thailand || Decision  || 5 || 3:00
|-  bgcolor="#FFBBBB"
| 2004-12-10 || Loss ||align=left| Chokdee Por.Pramuk || P.Pramuk Fights, Lumpinee Stadium || Bangkok, Thailand || Decision (Unanimous) || 5 || 3:00
|-
! style=background:white colspan=9 |
|-
|-  bgcolor="#cfc"
| 2004-07-02 || Win||align=left| Namsaknoi Yudthagarngamtorn || Paianun Fights, Lumpinee Stadium || Bangkok, Thailand || Decision || 5 || 3:00
|-  bgcolor="#CCFFCC"
| 2004-03-23 || Win ||align=left| Chokdee Por.Pramuk || P.Pramuk Fights, Lumpinee Stadium || Bangkok, Thailand || Decision  || 5 || 3:00
|-  bgcolor="#CCFFCC"
| 2003-12-02 || Win ||align=left| Petnamek Sor Siriwat || Suk Praiannant Fights, Lumpinee Stadium || Bangkok, Thailand || Decision (Unanimous) || 5 || 3:00
|-
! style=background:white colspan=9 |
|-
|-  bgcolor="#FFBBBB"
| 2003-10-03 || Loss ||align=left| Munkong Keatsomkuan || SUK Paianun, Lumpinee Stadium || Bangkok, Thailand || Decision  || 5 || 3:00

|-  bgcolor="#cfc"
| 2002-11-11 || Win||align=left| Noppadech2 Chuwattana || Lumpinee Stadium || Bangkok, Thailand || Decision  || 5 || 3:00

|-  bgcolor="#FFBBBB"
| 2002-05-18 || Loss ||align=left| Huasai Sor.Phumphanmuang ||  || Bangkok, Thailand || Decision  || 5 || 3:00
|-
| colspan=9 | Legend:

Personal life 
In 2015, Naruepol Fairtex (aka "Mr. GQ" ) moved to the United States to teach, train, and groom Muay Thai fighters in Northern California. He is currently affiliated with KOA Fitness in Newark, CA as the head instructor of the Muay Thai program.

See also 
 List of male kickboxers

References

1985 births
Living people
Lightweight kickboxers
Welterweight kickboxers
Naruepol Fairtex
Naruepol Fairtex
The Contender (TV series) participants